Bay of Arauco or Bahia de Araucan, is a bay located on the coast of the Arauco Province, of the Bío Bío Region of Chile.  The bay, is between the mountains of the Nahuelbuta Range to the east and to the west the Santa Maria Island and northwest the Pacific Ocean.  It is south and west of the Bay of Concepción and north of Arauco. The Bio Bio River flows into the bay at its northern end 10 km west of the city of Concepcion. On its shores are the cities of Lota, Colonel and Arauco.

Sources 
  Francisco Solano Asta Buruaga y Cienfuegos, Diccionario geográfico de la República de Chile: Arauco (Ensenada ó bahía de). Pg. 49

Bay of Arauco
Arauco
Coasts of Biobío Region